Richard Russell (born March 18, 1971) is an English record producer and the owner of British record label XL Recordings.

Career
XL Recordings was founded in 1989 by Tim Palmer and Nick Halkes to release dance music. Richard Russell joined XL as an A & R scout in 1991.

In 1992, Russell released a single titled "The Bouncer" as part of a duo named Kicks Like a Mule. The Guardian described the song as rave music that was "knocked into shape in about five hours" which "crossed over from pirate radio to reach number seven in the charts." Russell appeared on Top of the Pops and was initially signed to London Records for an album but was dropped from London before its completion.

By 2007, Russell was a chairman and half owner of the record label XL Recordings, which had released albums by acclaimed groups such as the White Stripes, Dizzee Rascal, Thom Yorke and MIA.

Between 2007 and 2009, Russell worked with the American musician and lyricist Gil Scott-Heron to produce the album I'm New Here, released in 2010. He also conceived the reworking of the original album, We're New Here, remixed by Jamie xx and released in 2011.

In 2011, Russell joined Damon Albarn and several other producers on a trip to Congo where they recorded the album Kinshasa One Two as the newly established DRC Music (Democratic Republic of the Congo Music) group. The album features various producers including Russell, Dan the Automator, Jneiro Jarel, T-E-E-D, Rodaidh McDonald and Kwes alongside various local musicians from Congo. It was released on 7 November 2011 on CD and LP, following a digital release the previous month.

In 2012, Russell and Damon Albarn co-produced The Bravest Man in the Universe, the new studio album from Bobby Womack. In April 2012, Russell became the youngest ever recipient of the prestigious Strat Award, named after music manager Tony Stratton Smith, at the Music Week Awards in London. Russell's label, XL Recordings was named Label of the Year at the ceremony.

In April 2020, Russell released his autobiography Liberation Through Hearing through publishing house White Rabbit.

Production discography
 Kicks Like a Mule - The Bouncer (1992) - co-artist & co-producer on "The Bouncer" with Nick Halkes
 Gil Scott-Heron - I'm New Here (2010) - producer on all tracks
 Gil Scott-Heron & Jamie xx - We're New Here (2011) - co-producer on all tracks, commissioner 
 DRC Music - Kinshasa One Two (2011) - co-producer on "Hallo" and "If You Wish to Stay Awake", producer on "Respect of the Rules"
 Bobby Womack - The Bravest Man in the Universe (2012) - co-producer on all tracks with Damon Albarn
 Damon Albarn - Everyday Robots (2014) - producer on all tracks with Damon Albarn
 Ibeyi - Ibeyi (2015) - producer on all tracks
 Everything Is Recorded - Close But Not Quite EP (2017) - artist & producer on all tracks
 Ibeyi - Ash (2017) - producer on all tracks
 Everything Is Recorded - Everything Is Recorded (2018) - artist & producer on all tracks
 Everything Is Recorded - FRIDAY FOREVER (2020) - artist & producer on all tracks
 Ibeyi - Spell 31 (2022) - producer on all tracks

References

External links
 Interview, HitQuarters September 2008
 Interview, Daily Telegraph July 2010

British music industry executives
Living people
English electronic musicians
English record producers
1971 births
Musicians from London